The Complete Chester Gould's Dick Tracy (also known as The Complete Dick Tracy) is a series of 29 hardcover books published by The Library of American Comics, an imprint of IDW Publishing, that bring together every Dick Tracy comic strip in chronological order, both black-and-white dailies and Sunday strips, written and drawn by Chester Gould from its premiere on October 4, 1931, until December 25, 1977.

Format

Volumes 1–6

These volumes measure 9.5 inches x 7 inches (242 mm × 178 mm) with approximately 350 pages per volume. The books were edited and designed by Ted Adams, with cover design by Ashley Wood and introductions by Max Allan Collins. The books feature an interview with the creator, Chester Gould, conducted by Max Allan Collins.

Volumes 7–29

These later volumes measure 11 x 8.5 inches, (280 mm × 216 mm) with about 250-300 pages per volume. They are edited and designed by Dean Mullaney, with introductions by Max Allan Collins and essays by Jeff Kersten.

After the publication of the first six volumes of the series, it was handed over by its editor and the CEO of IDW Publishing, Ted Adams, to the IDW imprint The Library of American Comics (LoAC). Dean Mullaney became the new editor of the Dick Tracy reprint series. As this transition happened, it was decided that the size of the volumes would be increased to match the other LoAC book lines. Even though this meant that the Sunday strips were printed 40 percent larger in this new iteration of the series, the daily strips were actually printed smaller compared to the size they had in the first six volumes, since there were now three strips to a page instead of two. A new cover design was also introduced, the introductory essays grew to become broader and more extensive, delivering a more complete history of the strip and its creator Gould. Contact was established with the Gould family, the Dick Tracy Museum and the Shel Dorf collection to obtain more archival material, such as art and photographs. Jeff Kersten began to contribute afterword essays which place the Dick Tracy strip in historical context and elaborates on its cultural impact.

Volumes

{| class="wikitable sortable"
|+ style="background-color:#B0C4DE" | Volumes
|-
! style="background-color:#D0E4FE" data-sort-type="number" | Volume 
! style="background-color:#D0E4FE" | Release date
! style="background-color:#D0E4FE" | Title
! style="background-color:#D0E4FE" | Period
| style="background-color:#D0E4FE" | Page count
! style="background-color:#D0E4FE" | ISBN
|-
|1||2006-?||The Complete Chester Gould's Dick Tracy: Dailies & Sundays - Vol. 1||1931–1933||364||
|-
|2||2007-05-08||The Complete Chester Gould's Dick Tracy: Dailies & Sundays - Vol. 2||1933–1935||380||
|-
|3||2007-12-01||The Complete Chester Gould's Dick Tracy: Dailies & Sundays - Vol. 3||1935–1936||352||
|-
|4||2008-05-06||The Complete Chester Gould's Dick Tracy: Dailies & Sundays - Vol. 4||1936–1938||344||
|-
|5||2008-08-15||The Complete Chester Gould's Dick Tracy: Dailies & Sundays - Vol. 5||1938–1939||352||
|-
|6||2009-01-29||The Complete Chester Gould's Dick Tracy: Dailies & Sundays - Vol. 6||1939–1941||346||
|-
|7||2009-05-26||The Complete Dick Tracy: Dailies & Sundays - Vol. 7||1941–1942||288||
|-
|8||2009-08-17||The Complete Dick Tracy: Dailies & Sundays - Vol. 8||1942–1944||264||
|-
|9||2010-01-26||The Complete Dick Tracy: Dailies & Sundays - Vol. 9||1944–1945||266||
|-
|10||2010-06-22||The Complete Dick Tracy: Dailies & Sundays - Vol. 10||1945–1947||266||
|-
|11||2011-02-15||The Complete Dick Tracy: Dailies & Sundays - Vol. 11||1947–1948||266||
|-
|12||2011-10-25||The Complete Dick Tracy: Dailies & Sundays - Vol. 12||1948–1950||276||
|-
|13||2012-05-29||The Complete Dick Tracy: Dailies & Sundays - Vol. 13||1950–1951||252||
|-
|14||2013-01-15||The Complete Dick Tracy: Dailies & Sundays - Vol. 14||1951–1953||256||
|-
|15||2013-07-09||The Complete Dick Tracy: Dailies & Sundays - Vol. 15||1953–1954||256||
|-
|16||2014-04-08||The Complete Dick Tracy: Dailies & Sundays - Vol. 16||1954–1956||276||
|-
|17||2014-10-14||The Complete Dick Tracy: Dailies & Sundays - Vol. 17||1956–1957||276||
|-
|18||2015-05-12||The Complete Dick Tracy: Dailies & Sundays - Vol. 18||1957–1959||276||
|-
|19||2015-11-24||The Complete Dick Tracy: Dailies & Sundays - Vol. 19||1959–1961||276||
|-
|20||2016-05-31||The Complete Dick Tracy: Dailies & Sundays - Vol. 20||1961–1962||272||
|-
|21||2017-01-31||The Complete Dick Tracy: Dailies & Sundays - Vol. 21||1962–1964||272||
|-
|22||2017-06-27||The Complete Dick Tracy: Dailies & Sundays - Vol. 22||1964–1965||288||
|-
|23||2017-12-19||The Complete Dick Tracy: Dailies & Sundays - Vol. 23||1966–1967||264||
|-
|24||2018-05-22||The Complete Dick Tracy: Dailies & Sundays - Vol. 24||1967–1969||296||
|-
|25||2019-01-15||The Complete Dick Tracy: Dailies & Sundays - Vol. 25||1969–1970||296||
|-
|26||2019-06-11||The Complete Dick Tracy: Dailies & Sundays - Vol. 26||1970–1972||296||
|-
|27||2020-01-14||The Complete Dick Tracy: Dailies & Sundays - Vol. 27||1972–1974||296||
|-
|28||2020-06-23||The Complete Dick Tracy: Dailies & Sundays - Vol. 28||1974–1976||288||
|-
|29||2020-12-08||The Complete Dick Tracy: Dailies & Sundays - Vol. 29||1976–1977||288||
|-
|}

Upcoming volumes

The six initial volumes published by IDW which were published in a smaller format are planned to be reissued in a reformatted version to match the larger format of the later volumes in the series, to make a fully coherent book suite.

References

External links
 Publisher website - IDW Publishing - The Library of American Comics - The Complete Chester Gould's Dick Tracy
 The Library of American Comics' YouTube channel - Inside look: Dick Tracy - Vol. 7: 1941-1942
 The Library of American Comics' YouTube channel - Inside look: Dick Tracy - Vol. 8: 1942-1944
 Preview - The Complete Chester Gould's Dick Tracy - Vol. 20

Comic strip collection books
Dick Tracy
The Library of American Comics publications